The Henry Mann House is a historic house in Albuquerque, New Mexico. It was built in 1905 by Henry Mann, who operated a market garden near Old Town with his brothers. The house cost $2,700 and the contractor was Wallace Hesselden, who also completed the John Pearce House the same year. The property was added to the New Mexico State Register of Cultural Properties in 1979 and the National Register of Historic Places in 1980.

The house is a one-and-a-half-story brick building with modest Queen Anne elements. The house has a complex roofline, with a high Dutch gable over the main body of the house and smaller intersecting gables on both street-facing elevations. The lower gable ends are shingled and decorated with radiating spindles at each peak. The ground-floor windows are 1-over-1 wooden sash windows set in arched openings. The house also has shed-roofed front and rear porches with turned wooden posts.

References

Houses in Albuquerque, New Mexico
Houses on the National Register of Historic Places in New Mexico
New Mexico State Register of Cultural Properties
National Register of Historic Places in Albuquerque, New Mexico
Houses completed in 1905
Queen Anne architecture in New Mexico